Nicholas Hume-Loftus, 1st Earl of Ely PC (I) (1708 – 31 October 1766) was an Anglo-Irish peer and member of the House of Lords.

He was the son of Nicholas Loftus, 1st Viscount Loftus and Anne Ponsonby, daughter of William Ponsonby, 1st Viscount Duncannon and Mary Moore. He sat in the Irish House of Commons as the Member of Parliament for Bannow from 1736 to 1760 and for Fethard, County Wexford between 1761 and 1763. In 1763 he succeeded to his father's titles and assumed his seat in the Irish House of Lords. In 1764 he was invested as a member of the Privy Council of Ireland. On 23 October 1766 he was created Earl of Ely in County Wicklow in the Peerage of Ireland.

He married Mary Hume, daughter of Sir Gustavus Hume, 3rd Baronet, on 18 August 1736. He was succeeded by his son, Nicholas Hume-Loftus, 2nd Earl of Ely. During the celebrated hearing into the son's mental incapacity, much was said about the ill-treatment he had received from his father.

References

1714 births
1766 deaths
People from County Wexford
Members of the Parliament of Ireland (pre-1801) for County Wexford constituencies
Irish MPs 1727–1760
Irish MPs 1761–1768
Earls in the Peerage of Ireland
Members of the Privy Council of Ireland
Nicholas